Caligula is the second live album by comedian Anthony Jeselnik, released January 15, 2013 by Comedy Central Records.

Track listing

Charts

References

2013 live albums
2010s comedy albums
Anthony Jeselnik albums
Live spoken word albums
2010s spoken word albums
Comedy Central Records live albums
Stand-up comedy albums